Krynytchky is an urban-type settlement in Kamianske Raion of Dnipropetrovsk Oblast in Ukraine. It hosts the administration of Krynychky settlement hromada, one of the hromadas of Ukraine. Population: 

Krynychky is located on both banks of the Mokra Sura River, a right tributary of the Dnieper.

Until 18 July 2020, Krynychky was the administrative center of Krynychky Raion. The raion was abolished in July 2020 as part of the administrative reform of Ukraine, which reduced the number of raions of Dnipropetrovsk Oblast to seven. The area of Krynychky Raion was merged into Kamianske Raion.

Economy

Transportation
Krynychky is on a paved road connecting Kamianske with Svitlohirske. In Svitlohirske, it has access to the M04 highway connecting Dnipro and Kropyvnytskyi.

References

Urban-type settlements in Kamianske Raion
Yekaterinoslav Governorate